Augustus Charles Hobart-Hampden (1 April 182219 June 1886) was an English-born Ottoman admiral (hence widely known as Hobart Pasha).

Biography 

Hobart-Hampden was born at  Walton-on­ the-Wolds in Leicestershire, the third son of the 6th Earl of Buckinghamshire.

In his youth, he was educated at King Edward VI Grammar School, Louth, Lincolnshire.

In 1835 he entered the Royal Navy and served as a midshipman on the coast of Brazil in the suppression of the slave trade, displaying much gallantry in the operations. In 1842 he passed his examinations at Dartmouth Naval College.

In 1862 he retired from the navy with the rank of Captain but his love of adventure led him, during the American Civil War, to take the command of a blockade runner. He had the good fortune to run the blockade eighteen times, conveying war material to Charleston and returning with a cargo of cotton.

In 1867 he became “naval adviser to the Ottoman Sultan by his  brother's recommendation.” He was immediately nominated to the command of that fleet, with the rank of "Bahriye Livasi" (rear-admiral). In this capacity he performed splendid service in helping to suppress the insurrection in Crete, and was rewarded by the Sultan with the title of Pasha (1869). In 1874 Hobart, whose name had, on representations made by Greece, been removed from the British Navy Directory, was reinstated; his restoration did not, however, last long, for on the outbreak of the Russo-Turkish war he again entered Ottoman service.

On the conclusion of peace Hobart still remained in Ottoman service, and in 1881 was appointed Mushir, or marshal, being the first Christian to hold that high office. He died at Milan on 19 June 1886 and was brought to Istanbul and buried at English Cemetery in Selimiye.

He recorded his adventures in the book Never Caught, published in 1867.

References

External links 

 
 
 
 

1822 births
1886 deaths
Military personnel from Leicestershire
British admirals
Royal Navy officers
Ottoman Empire admirals
People of the American Civil War
People educated at King Edward VI Grammar School, Louth
Younger sons of earls